William Tracy (December 1, 1917 – June 18, 1967) was an American character actor.

Early life and career
Tracy was born in Pittsburgh, Pennsylvania.

He is perhaps best known for the role of Pepi Katona, the delivery boy, in The Shop Around the Corner (1940). He starred in the John Ford film Tobacco Road (1941), and appeared in Brother Rat (1938) and Alfred Hitchcock's Mr. and Mrs. Smith (1941).

In 1940, Tracy began a recurring role as Sgt. Dorian "Dodo" Doubleday in eight films teamed with Joe Sawyer as Sgt. Ames, the first six for Hal Roach's Streamliners service comedies, beginning with Tanks a Million (1941). This B-movie comedy was nominated for an Academy Award for Best Musical Score.  In 1942, he starred alongside Randolph Scott, John Payne and Alan Hale Jr in To the shores of Tripoli. Then back again as Sgt Doubleday for two more at Hal Roach studios and the last two were for Lippert turesPic, concluding with Mr. Walkie Talkie (1952) being set during the Korean War.

In the 1950s, Tracy primarily did television work, where his most notable role was "Hotshot Charlie" in the 1953 series Terry and the Pirates. He previously played the lead role of Terry Lee in the 1940 serial with the same title.

On the June 14, 1951 episode of the radio series Suspense, The Truth About Jerry Baxter, the 33-year-old Tracy played the title character, a teenage marijuana addict.  The episode claimed to be drawn from actual events, but is more like a radio version of Reefer Madness.

He was married to actress Lois James from 1945-1954.

Tracy died in Hollywood, California, at the age of 49. He is interred in Valhalla Memorial Park Cemetery in North Hollywood, Los Angeles.

Filmography

References

External links

 
 
 

1917 births
1967 deaths
American male stage actors
American male film actors
American male television actors
Male actors from Pittsburgh
20th-century American male actors